Edward S. Shapiro (born 1938) is a historian of American history and American Jewish history. He received his BA at Georgetown University and his PhD at Harvard University. His doctoral dissertation was The American Distributists and the New Deal. Most of Shapiro's career was spent as professor of American history at Seton Hall University. He is the father of Marc B. Shapiro.

Shapiro has been a resident of West Orange, New Jersey, since 1969.

Books, articles, lectures
Clio From the Right: Essays of a Conservative Historian, University Press of America, 1983
A Time for Healing, American Jewry since World War II , Johns Hopkins Press, 1992 (There are 748 copies in WorldCat libraries) 
Letters of Sidney Hook" Democracy, Communism, and the Cold War, M.E. Sharpe, 1995
We Are Many: Reflections on American Jewish History and Identity, Syracuse University Press, 2005
Crown Heights: Blacks, Jews, and the 1991 Brooklyn Riot, Brandeis University Press, 2006 (There are 343 copies in WorldCat libraries)  
Yiddish in America : Essays on Yiddish Culture in the Golden Land, University of Scranton Press, 2008
A Unique People in a Unique Land: Essays on American Jewish History, Academic Studies Press, 2022
Shapiro articles and reviews
Shapiro book reviews for Jewish Book Council 
Shapiro speaking at Sidney Hook Symposium

References 

1938 births
Living people
21st-century American historians
21st-century American male writers
Harvard University alumni
Georgetown University alumni
Seton Hall University faculty
People from West Orange, New Jersey
Historians from New Jersey
American male non-fiction writers